Velyushevo is a rural locality (a village) in Fominskoye Rural Settlement, Sheksninsky District, Vologda Oblast, Russia. The population was 27 as of 2002.

Geography 
Velyushevo is located 44 km southeast of Sheksna (the district's administrative centre) by road. Aleksino is the nearest rural locality.

References 

Rural localities in Sheksninsky District